Novi Grad, formerly Bosanski Novi, is a town and municipality in Bosnia and Herzegovina. Administratively, it is located in the Republika Srpska entity. Situated in the far northwest of the country, it lies across the Una from the Croatian town of Dvor. , the town has a population of 11,063 while its municipality comprises a total of 27,115 inhabitants.

Known for its scenic quay, Novi Grad lies at the confluence of the Una and Sana rivers.

Geography
Novi Grad is located on the right bank of the Una and both banks of the Sana, between two geographic zones: the slopes of the mountains of Grmeč and Kozara, and the alluvial land surrounding the town's two rivers.

History
The town was first mentioned in 1280 under the Latin name Castrum Novum which, literally translated, means 'new fort'. In 1483, the Battle of Una was fought near the city. It belonged to the dukes of Blagaj and in the early sixteenth century came under power of Nikola Zrinski. Croatian ban Adam Bačan conquered Novi in 1693. Evliya Çelebi on his journey through Bosnia mentions that Croatian nobles built Novi Grad.  In 1895, during Austro-Hungarian rule in Bosnia and Herzegovina, the town was officially given the name Bosanski Novi. At the same time, the city included around 3,300 people with 550 households. Wooden bridges existed across the Una and Sana rivers which the citizens had to guard against floods in the autumn and spring. For that reason, a current-day symbol of the town was built in 1906—the Una quay.

In 1872, Novi Grad was the first municipality to have a train station on the new Bosnian railway, which afforded it significant cultural and economic advantages over other Krajina  municipalities. The first hospital was established around the same time.

From 1929 to 1941, Bosanski Novi was part of the Vrbas Banovina of the Kingdom of Yugoslavia.

From 1992 through 1995, the town was ethnically cleansed of its Bosniak and Croat inhabitants, thereby rendering it almost completely Serb-populated. In order to distance the town from its Bosnian history and its cultural roots and in tune with the war politics, the local Serb government renamed the town to Novi Grad, a change criticized by Croat and Bosniak residents. Consequently, majority of people from Bosanski Novi were misplaced and live all over Europe, the American continent, Australia and elsewhere around the globe.

After the Bosnian War, Kostajnica was split from the municipality.

Settlements
Aside from the town of Novi Grad, the municipality includes the following settlements:

 Ahmetovci
 Blagaj Japra
 Blagaj Rijeka
 Blatna
 Cerovica
 Crna Rijeka
 Čađavica Donja
 Čađavica Gornja
 Čađavica Srednja
 Ćele
 Devetaci
 Dobrljin
 Donje Vodičevo
 Donji Agići
 Donji Rakani
 Gornje Vodičevo
 Gornji Agići
 Gornji Rakani
 Grabašnica
 Hozići
 Johovica
 Jošava
 Kršlje
 Kuljani
 Lješljani
 Mala Krupska Rujiška
 Mala Novska Rujiška
 Mala Žuljevica
 Maslovare
 Matavazi
 Mazić
 Petkovac
 Poljavnice
 Prusci
 Radomirovac
 Rakovac
 Rašće
 Ravnice
 Rudice
 Sokolište
 Suhača
 Svodna
 Trgovište
 Vedovica
 Velika Rujiška
 Velika Žuljevica
 Vitasovci

Demographics

Population

Ethnic composition

Economy
The economy is based on a few industries and a number of private firms. Novi Grad has notable potential in tourism, wood processing, food production and management of water resources.

The following table gives a preview of total number of registered people employed in legal entities per their core activity (as of 2018):

Sport
There are several active sports organizations in the town, including football, handball and basketball clubs.

The local football club is FK Sloboda Novi Grad.

See also

Municipalities of Bosnia and Herzegovina
Bosanska Krajina

Notes

References

External links
 

Populated places in Novi Grad, Bosnia and Herzegovina
 
Bosnia and Herzegovina–Croatia border crossings